Bray is a village in Kgalagadi District of Botswana. It is located in the eastern part of the district, on the border with South Africa opposite a village of the same name in that country. The population was 1,041 in the 2011 census. It has a primary school.

References

Kgalagadi District
Villages in Botswana
Botswana–South Africa border crossings